Spain competed at the 1994 Winter Olympics in Lillehammer, Norway.

Alpine skiing

Men

Men's combined

Women

Cross-country skiing

Men

1 Starting delay based on 10 km results. 
C = Classical style, F = Freestyle

Figure skating

Women

Freestyle skiing

Men

Women

References
Official Olympic Reports
 Olympic Winter Games 1994, full results by sports-reference.com

Nations at the 1994 Winter Olympics
1994
Olympics